KJKT (90.7 FM, "The Buzz") is a radio station broadcasting an alternative music format. Licensed to Spearfish, South Dakota, United States, the station is currently owned by Black Hills State University.

References

External links
 
 

JKT
JKT
Modern rock radio stations in the United States
Lawrence County, South Dakota
Radio stations established in 1990
1990 establishments in South Dakota